Juan Diego Molina Martínez (born 5 November 1993), commonly known as Stoichkov, is a Spanish professional footballer who plays for SD Eibar as a forward.

He made over 130 Segunda División appearances and scored over 50 goals for Mallorca, Alcorcón, Sabadell and Eibar, having played at lower levels until nearly aged 25.

Club career

Early career
Born in San Roque, Cádiz, Andalusia, Stoichkov received his nickname after FC Barcelona's 1990s forward Hristo Stoichkov. His father, who met the Bulgarian international while working at a bar in Barcelona, wanted to legally name his son Stoichkov; this decision was vetoed by his mother.

Stoichkov finished his formation with RCD Espanyol, also in the Catalan capital. On 20 July 2012 he joined Segunda División B side CP Cacereño, but spent the vast majority of his spell with the reserves.

On 5 September 2013 Stoichkov signed for Tercera División side CD San Roque, club he already represented as a youth. Ahead of the 2014–15 campaign, he moved abroad for the first time in his career and joined Gibraltarian side Europa FC, playing in the UEFA Europa League qualifying stages before rejoining San Roque in December 2014.

On 28 January 2016, Stoichkov moved to Real Balompédica Linense in the third level. He immediately became a starter for the side, and scored ten goals for them in the 2017–18 campaign.

Mallorca
On 6 July 2018, Stoichkov signed a four-year contract with RCD Mallorca, newly promoted to Segunda División. He made his professional debut on 7 September, coming on as a second-half substitute for Carlos Castro in a 1–0 home win against Cádiz CF.

Stoichkov scored his first professional goal on 27 October 2018, netting the equaliser in a 2–2 home draw against UD Las Palmas. He contributed with three league goals during the campaign as his side achieved promotion to La Liga.

On 20 July 2019, Stoichkov joined AD Alcorcón in the second division on a one-year loan deal. In his year with the team from the Community of Madrid, he finished joint fourth in the league's top scorers with 16 goals.

On 5 October 2020, Stoichkov joined CE Sabadell FC on loan for the 2020–21 campaign. He scored 11 goals, including both of a 2–2 home draw with neighbours Girona FC, but the Catalans were relegated.

Eibar
On 21 July 2021, Stoichkov moved to fellow second division side SD Eibar on a three-year deal. He opened his account with two goals in a 3–2 win at Basque neighbours Real Sociedad B on 11 September, adding a further brace to win at home to Sporting de Gijón by the same score eight days later. He was October's Segunda División Player of the Month for three goals in five games.

Stoichkov was sent off for the first time in his career on 6 March 2022, at the end of a 4–1 loss at FC Cartagena in which he opened the scoring. His suspension was overturned on appeal when the Royal Spanish Football Federation ruled that he did not deny his opponent a clear goalscoring chance. He finished the campaign with 21 goals, behind joint top scorers Borja Bastón and Cristhian Stuani, while his team made the play-offs in third.

Career statistics

Club

References

External links

1993 births
Living people
Footballers from San Roque, Cádiz
Spanish footballers
Association football forwards
Segunda División players
Segunda División B players
Tercera División players
Divisiones Regionales de Fútbol players
CP Cacereño players
CD San Roque footballers
Real Balompédica Linense footballers
RCD Mallorca players
AD Alcorcón footballers
CE Sabadell FC footballers
SD Eibar footballers
Europa F.C. players
Spanish expatriate footballers
Spanish expatriate sportspeople in Gibraltar
Expatriate footballers in Gibraltar